The Big Catch is a 1920 American short silent Western film released by the Universal Film Mfg. Co. (later to become Universal Pictures), written by Ford Beebe, directed by Leo D. Maloney and starring Hoot Gibson.

Cast
 Hoot Gibson
 Dorothy Wood
 Jim Corey
 Harry Jackson
 Chick Morrison
 Ida Tenbrook

See also
 List of American films of 1920
 Hoot Gibson filmography

References

External links
 

1920 films
1920 Western (genre) films
1920 short films
American silent short films
American black-and-white films
Films directed by Leo D. Maloney
Silent American Western (genre) films
1920s American films